T'urpuqucha (Quechua t'urpu pointed, sharp, qucha lake, hispanicized spelling Turpoccocha) is a lake in Peru. It is located in the Ayacucho Region, Lucanas Province, Aucara District. T'urpuqucha lies in the Pampa Galeras – Barbara D'Achille National Reserve.

References

Lakes of Peru
Lakes of Ayacucho Region